Pungtungia shiraii is a species of cyprinid fish found in Japan.

Etymology
Named in honor of Kunihiko Shirai, Bureau of Game and Hunting of the Ministry of Agriculture and Forestry, who obtained a collection of fishes downstream of the Tama River, including type of this one, and “kindly forwarded to the writer for identification”.

References

Pungtungia
Taxa named by Masamitsu Ōshima
Fish described in 1957